Washington Township is one of the fourteen townships of Shelby County, Ohio, United States.  The 2000 census found 2,083 people in the township, 1,875 of whom lived in the unincorporated portions of the township.

Geography
Located in the southern part of the county, it borders the following townships:
Turtle Creek Township - north
Clinton Township - northeast
Orange Township - east
Washington Township, Miami County - south
Loramie Township - west
Cynthian Township - northwest

The village of Lockington is located in southeastern Washington Township.

Name and history
Washington Township was established in 1825. It is one of forty-three Washington Townships statewide.

Government
The township is governed by a three-member board of trustees, who are elected in November of odd-numbered years to a four-year term beginning on the following January 1. Two are elected in the year after the presidential election and one is elected in the year before it. There is also an elected township fiscal officer, who serves a four-year term beginning on April 1 of the year after the election, which is held in November of the year before the presidential election. Vacancies in the fiscal officership or on the board of trustees are filled by the remaining trustees.

References

External links
County website

Townships in Shelby County, Ohio
Townships in Ohio